Surrounded by Silence is the third studio album by Prefuse 73. It was released on Warp on March 21, 2005.

Critical reception
At Metacritic, which assigns a weighted average score out of 100 to reviews from mainstream critics, Surrounded by Silence received an average score of 73% based on 21 reviews, indicating "generally favorable reviews".

John Bush of AllMusic gave the album 3.5 stars out of 5, calling it "just another underground rap record, with the usual collection of untraceable sound detritus to anchor its productions."

Track listing

Charts

References

External links
 

2005 albums
Prefuse 73 albums
Warp (record label) albums